Gergely Nagy may mean:

 Gergely Nagy (footballer), Hungarian goalkeeper born in 1994
 Gergely Nagy (scholar), Hungarian medievalist and Tolkien scholar